Claudio Aprile (born 23 January 1969) is a Uruguayan–Canadian celebrity chef, restaurateur, cookbook author, and TV personality of Italian descent best known for serving as a main host/judge on CTV's culinary competition MasterChef Canada since January 2014.  Having owned and worked at multiple Michelin-starred restaurants over the years, he recently served as the head chef, owner and manager of the acclaimed Toronto restaurant Copetin from its grand opening in July 2017 until its closure in March 2019. In the fall of 2019, Aprile opened up a new restaurant named Xango Toronto, which he presently serves as the owner, restaurateur and head chef of since the closing of Copetin, Colborne Lane and the Origin chain.

Biography

Claudio Aprile was born in Uruguay, grew up in Toronto, and has traveled, lived, and worked in professional, multi-Michelin starred restaurant kitchens as a professional chef internationally.  Aprile has been cooking since he was 14 years old, always wanting to be a chef since the age of 5, having spent his career in kitchens working through the ranks becoming the successful professional celebrity chef and restaurateur that he is today. He never received formal training for becoming a chef, and stated that, as a child, he informed his mother that he would become one, rather than a desire to attempt to become one. At 18 he travelled to Thailand, which had a profound influence on his style of cooking. He visited 160 cities in 17 countries, before stopping in England, where he worked extensively throughout London until earning the executive position as the head chef at Bali Sugar in Notting Hill.

Throughout his career Aprile has passed through some of the most renowned Michelin-starred restaurant kitchens around the globe. The Uruguayan-born, Toronto-raised chef is a product of diverse elements, with a cooking style representative of his time spent in kitchens around the world, including Bali Sugar in London, which earned him outstanding reviews as a young executive chef where he received local and international critical acclaim. On returning to Toronto in 2000, Aprile cemented that reputation at Senses in Toronto, where he impressed critics and diners with use of avant-garde and experimental cooking techniques.

Career

Colborne Lane (2007-2013)

In 2007, Aprile opened the successful restaurant Colborne Lane in Toronto, Canada. In 2009, he opened the original Origin restaurant in Toronto. Touted for its modernist food and nitrogen desserts, Colborne Lane led the pack in creativity across an unimaginative Toronto foodscape. Due to the success of the original location, he was able to open two more locations within Toronto in the subsequent years.

Colborne Lane was lauded as one of the best restaurants in the world, and Aprile was named one of the most innovative chefs working in Canada. With Colborne Lane offering beautifully crafted, precisely plated fusion cuisine with molecular gastronomy, he switched gears with Origin restaurant. Opening in 2010, Origin offered fast, fresh, and accessible food, delivered to guests sitting right across from the chef in the open kitchen. Toronto Life magazine and Now magazine voted Origin the #1 restaurant in Toronto.

Colborne Lane was located on Colborne Street in Toronto, close to St. Lawrence Market. Aprile’s first restaurant, Colborne Lane, opened to immediate success and became the breeding ground for some of Toronto’s current top chefs including Jonathan Poon, Steve Gonzalez, Matt Blondin, Jonathan Bower, and Romain Avril. It was named one of the top ten new restaurants in Canada in enRoute Magazine. Aprile officially closed the restaurant in February 2013.

Origin (2009-2017)

In 2009, Aprile opened the first Origin restaurant as the executive chef and owner. The original restaurant opened its doors to the public in 2010, it was located on King Street in Toronto and closed in early 2017. In subsequent years, Aprile opened two more Origin restaurants, one in Liberty Village and one in Bayview Village. The Liberty Village location opened in 2012 and closed in 2013. The Origin North Bayview Village location opened in June 2013, in a two-storey building in the parking lot of the Bayview Village mall. The third of Aprile’s Origin restaurants and the first outside the downtown area, it was promotionally featured in MasterChef Canada's Season 1 Restaurant Takeover, and closed in early 2016. Aprile served as the owner and creative force behind the Orderfire Restaurant Group, which included Toronto’s acclaimed Origin brand restaurants, which were voted the #1 restaurant in Toronto by Toronto Life and Now magazine.

Copetin Restaurant & Bar Toronto (2017-2019)

In June 2017, Aprile reinvented his original Origin restaurant space and opened Copetin Restaurant & Bar at the same Saint James location on King Street East in Toronto. This high-end restaurant of his was featured in Season 5's Restaurant Takeover in MasterChef Canada. The open-concept kitchen in the 80-seat dining room offered "not one, not two, but four separate menus: An a la carte dinner card for the eastern dining room, a menu of casual salads and sandwiches for the patio, a slate of bar snacks for the western "lounge" half of the resto, and an anything-goes tasting menu for those who elect to sit at the kitchen rail."

Xango (2019–present)

In September 2019, Aprile teamed up with Nick Di Donato of the Liberty Entertainment Group to open up Xango, located in the heart of Toronto's King St. West neighbourhood.

Masterchef Canada (2014–present)

Aprile is one of 3 presenters / judges on MasterChef Canada.

References

Further reading

Post City Toronto
Toronto Star
Toronto Life
Post City Toronto
The Huffington Post 
Mid Day
Post City Toronto
Art Culinaire 
Now Toronto
Toronto Life
blogTO
Instagram
Season 6 of Masterchef Canada is Officially Happening
TV,eh?
Newswire
Restobiz

1969 births
Living people
Canadian people of Italian descent
Canadian restaurateurs
Canadian television chefs
Participants in Canadian reality television series
Uruguayan emigrants to Canada
Uruguayan people of Italian descent